98.4 Capital FM (other variations of the name include Capital FM and Capital FM Kenya) is a Kenyan urban music radio station.

Location
Its offices are situated on the 19th floor of Lonrho House, along Standard Street in the central business district of Nairobi, the capital and largest city in Kenya. The coordinates of the radio station are:1°17'06.0"S, 36°49'22.0"E (Latitude:-1.285013; Longitude:36.822767).

Background 
Established in 1996 shortly after the liberalisation of Kenyan airwaves, it was the second FM station to be opened after 101.9 Metro FM, however several other FM stations have continued to crop up, catering to all tastes, 98.4 Capital FM continues to be a popular station especially among the middle-class and upper-class markets. The presenters play a variety of genres i.ehip hop, RnB, rock, neo soul, new jack swing, world music, jazz, techno and dance music. Capital FM now caters to Mombasa, Western Kenya, as well as the international community, via the internet.

When President Barack Obama visited Kenya in July 2015, he gave an exclusive one-on-one interview on 98.4 Capital FM, one of the only two one-on-one radio interviews that he gave during that visit.

Ownership
It is owned by the late Chris Kirubi, a Kenyan businessman.

Presenters 
Many of Kenya's biggest radio presenters all began at Capital FM – which has earned it the slogan – the home of nurturing radio talent. These include:
 
 Phil Matthews – head of The Radio Academy
 Sean Cardovillis – now working at Nation Media Group
 Jimmi Gathu – lead breakfast TV presenter at K24
 Caroline Mutoko – Marketing Manager at Kiss FM
 Zain Verjee – Anchor now with CNN
 Jo Thoenes – breakfast presenter in the UK
 Patricia Amira – of the Patricia show at KBC
 Alex Belfield – a radio DJ from the UK
 Fareed Khimani – Director at Nusu-Nusu Productions Limited, Executive Producer of MNET's Mashriki Mix Magazine show
 Seanice Kacungira – a businesswoman in Kampala, Uganda
 Eve D'Souza
 Gaetano Kagwa – Ugandan personality who gained fame due to his participation in the Big Brother Africa competition
 Nini Wacera
 Italia Masiero
 Preety aka Herpreet Jaswal
 Disk jockey Dr. Vey, Nairobi, Kenya
Rick Dees, host of the Rick Dees Weekly Top 40 every Saturday
Walt "Baby" Love, host of Gospel Traxx every Sunday afternoon

Fareed Khimani and Seanice Kacungira hosted a morning show from 2006 until 2009, which had a wide audience with high ratings.
Suleiman Munyua AKA Soulo – Currently a Copy Writer still at Capital FM
Fareed Khimani is back at Capital FM presenting the morning show with Davina Leonard

Capital Digital Media (CDM) 
Capital Digital Media is a section within the Capital FM company that deals with online and digital media presence. This includes digital sales and advertising, web development, video production and social media strategy.

References

External links

Music organisations based in Kenya
Radio stations in Kenya
Mass media in Nairobi
Radio stations established in 1996
1996 establishments in Kenya